Bülend Özveren (1943 – 18 October 2022) was a Turkish television presenter and sports commentator.

He graduated from Istanbul University, faculty of Law.

Özveren started working at TRT on 31 July 1965, first as a television presenter before becoming the sports commentator in 1972. 

From 1973 to 2012, he intermittently served as the Turkish commentator for the Eurovision Song Contest. Özveren spoke English, Japanese, Spanish and French, as well as his native Turkish.

Özveren died on 18 October 2022 in Istanbul at the age of 79, due to heart failure.

References

1943 births
2022 deaths
Television people from Istanbul
Istanbul University Faculty of Law alumni
Galatasaray High School alumni
Turkish television presenters
Sports commentators
20th-century Turkish people